Masonville Township is a civil township of Delta County in the U.S. state of Michigan.  The population was 1,734 at the 2010 census, down from 1,877 at the 2000 census.

Geography

Climate
 Masonville Township, Michigan

Communities
Ensign was an unincorporated community founded in 1880.  It became a station on the Minneapolis, St. Paul and Sault Ste. Marie Railroad in 1888.

Demographics
As of the census of 2000, there were 1,877 people, 771 households, and 548 families residing in the township.  The population density was 11.2 per square mile (4.3/km2).  There were 1,143 housing units at an average density of 6.8 per square mile (2.6/km2).  The racial makeup of the township was 94.14% White, 0.05% African American, 3.14% Native American, 0.37% Asian, 0.32% from other races, and 1.97% from two or more races. Hispanic or Latino of any race were 0.43% of the population.

There were 771 households, out of which 28.3% had children under the age of 18 living with them, 59.7% were married couples living together, 7.4% had a female householder with no husband present, and 28.8% were non-families. 25.2% of all households were made up of individuals, and 11.9% had someone living alone who was 65 years of age or older.  The average household size was 2.41 and the average family size was 2.87.

In the township the population was spread out, with 22.5% under the age of 18, 7.1% from 18 to 24, 25.1% from 25 to 44, 27.9% from 45 to 64, and 17.4% who were 65 years of age or older.  The median age was 42 years. For every 100 females, there were 101.4 males.  For every 100 females age 18 and over, there were 97.2 males.

The median income for a household in the township was $35,887, and the median income for a family was $42,778. Males had a median income of $35,568 versus $22,656 for females. The per capita income for the township was $18,375.  About 6.0% of families and 9.8% of the population were below the poverty line, including 10.4% of those under age 18 and 8.2% of those age 65 or over.

References

Notes

Sources

Townships in Delta County, Michigan
Townships in Michigan
Michigan populated places on Lake Michigan